Les Bons is a village in Andorra, located in the parish of Encamp.

Populated places in Andorra
Encamp